Frose is a village and a former municipality in the district of Salzlandkreis, in Saxony-Anhalt, Germany. Since 15 July 2009, it is part of the town Seeland.

References

External links 
 Frose Notgeld (emergency banknotes) depicting the various names of Frose between the years 960 and 1200.

Former municipalities in Saxony-Anhalt
Seeland, Germany
Duchy of Anhalt